Billie Frank or Billy Frank may refer to:

Billie Frank (Rude Awakening),  fictional character from the TV series Rude Awakening, played by Sherilyn Fenn
Billie Frank, fictional character from the film Glitter, played by Mariah Carey
Billy Frank, Jr., tribal fishing rights activist
Billy Frank, Sr. (Nisqually, 1880–1980), father of Billy Frank, Jr.,  original owner of Frank's Landing 
Billy Frank (cricketer), South African cricketer
Billy Frank, childhood name of Billy Graham

See also
William Frank (disambiguation)